River Street is a 1996 Australian film directed by Tony Mahood and starring Aden Young, Bill Hunter, Essie Davis, and Mitchell Dillon. It started filming on 18 September 1995.

References

External links

River Street at Oz Movies

Australian romantic comedy-drama films
1996 films
1990s English-language films
1990s Australian films